This is the list of notable stars in the constellation Tucana, sorted by decreasing brightness.

See also
List of stars by constellation

Notes

References

 Allen, R. H. (1963). Star Names; Their Lore and Meaning, Dover Publications, Inc., New York, p. 418.
 Wagman, M. (2003). Lost Stars, The Mcdonald & Woodward Publishing Company, Blacksburg, pp. 306–307.

List
Tucana